Many cities in Europe have different names in different languages. Some cities have also undergone name changes for political or other reasons. This article attempts to give all known different names for all major cities that are geographically or historically and culturally in Europe. It also includes some smaller towns that are important because of their location or history.

This article does not offer any opinion about what the "original", "official", "real" or "correct" name of any city is or was. Cities are listed alphabetically by their current best-known name in English. The English version is followed by variants in other languages, in alphabetical order by name, and then by any historical variants and former names. Several cities have diacritics in their listed name in English. It is very common that the press strip the diacritics and that means a parallel diacritic-free version is very often used in English. Foreign names that are the same as their English equivalents may be listed.

Note: The blue asterisks generally indicate the availability of a Wikipedia article in that language for that city; it also provides additional reference for the equivalence.  Red asterisks or a lack of an asterisk indicate that no such article exists, and that these equivalents without further footnotes should be viewed with caution.

See also

Exonyms by language

Afrikaans exonyms
Albanian exonyms
Basque exonyms
Bulgarian exonyms
Catalan exonyms
Croatian exonyms
Czech exonyms
Danish exonyms
Dutch exonyms
English exonyms
Estonian exonyms
Finnish exonyms
French exonyms
German
German exonyms
Australian place names changed from German names
German names for Central European towns
German placename etymology
List of English exonyms for German toponyms
List of German exonyms for places in Belgium
List of German exonyms for places in the Czech Republic
List of German exonyms for places in Croatia
List of German exonyms for places in Poland
List of German exonyms for places in Switzerland
List of German exonyms for places in Transylvania
Greek exonyms
Hungarian exonyms
Icelandic exonyms
Irish exonyms
Italian exonyms
Latvian exonyms
Names of Lithuanian places in other languages
Limburgish exonyms
Lithuanian exonyms
Names of Belarusian places in other languages
Luxembourgish exonyms
Maltese exonyms
Norwegian exonyms
Names of Belarusian places in other languages
Names of Lithuanian places in other languages
Portuguese exonyms
Romanian exonyms
Russian exonyms
Names of Belarusian places in other languages
Names of Lithuanian places in other languages
Serbian exonyms
Slavic toponyms for Greek places
Slovak exonyms
Slovenian exonyms
Spanish exonyms
Swedish exonyms
Turkish exonyms
Ukrainian exonyms
Vietnamese exonyms
Welsh exonyms

Other

 Exonym and endonym
 Toponymy
 Lists of places
 Lists of etymologies
 List of countries and capitals in native languages
 List of alternative country names
 List of country names in various languages
 List of European exonyms
 List of Latin place names in Europe
 List of European regions with alternative names
 List of European rivers with alternative names
 List of oceans with alternative names
 Place names in Irish
 List of traditional Greek place names
 List of names of Asian cities in different languages
 List of cities in Europe
 List of metropolitan areas in Europe by population
 List of villages in Europe by country
 Names of Belarusian places in other languages
 Names of Lithuanian places in other languages
 Names of places in Finland in Finnish and in Swedish

Sources

For Albanian names:
Albecorp, Atlas Gjeografik I Botës (1997)
For Bulgarian names:
Атлас География (1998)
For Croatian names:
Znanje, Školski Atlas,  (2000)
For Czech names:
Ikar, Školní Atlas,  (1999)
For Danish names:
Politikens Verdens Atlas,  (1998)
Alinea, Folke Skolens Atlas,  (2005) 
For Dutch names:
Atrium Wereld Atlas,  (2002)
For Estonian names:
Otava, Atlas,  (1997)
For Finnish names:
Uusi Iso Atlas,  (1998)
For French names:
LaRousse, Atlas Général (1976)
Magellan, Atlas Pratique,  (1997)
For German names:
Westermann, Diercke Weltatlas,  (2000)
Westermann, Durchblick Universalatlas,  (2005)
For Greek names:
Παγκόσμιος Άτλαντας,  (1995)
Γεωγραφικός Άτλαντας,  (1999)
For Hungarian names:
A Föld Világatlasz,  (1999)
For Irish names:
Collins-Longman, Atlas a haon do scoileanna na hÉireann (1977)
For Italian names:
Garzanti, Atlante Geografico e Storico,  (1994)
For Latvian names:
Pasaules Ģeogrāfijas Atlants,  (1997)
For Macedonian names:
Mojot Атлас (1991)
For Maltese names:
Lizio Zerafa, Agħraf Pajjiżek, Il-Ġografija (1992)
For Norwegian names:
Kunnskapsforlaget, Store Verdensatlas,  (1997)
For Polish names:
PPWK, Świat Atlas Geograficzny,  (1997)
For Portuguese names:
Celso Antunes, Atlas Geográfico,  (1999)
Bernard Jenner, Atlas Geográfico Ilustrado,  (1999) 
Edelbra, Atlas Universal,  (2001)
For Romanian names:
Octavian Mândruţ, Atlas Geografic Şcolar,  (1999)
Garamond, Atlas Geografic Didactic,  (1998)
LaRousse, Atlasul Statelor Lumii,  (1999)
E. Gregorian et al., Atlas Geografic Şcolar,  (1998)
For Russian names:
 Атлас Мира,  (2000)
For Serbian names:
 Географски Атлас (1997)
For Slovak names:
Ikar, Školský Atlas,  (1999)
For Slovene names:
Založba Mladinska knjiga, Atlas Sveta 2000,  (1998)
For Spanish names:
Atlas Mundial,  (1997)
Bill Boyle, Mi primer Atlas,  (1994)
Altas Escolar Universal Porrúa,  (1988)
For Swedish names:
Almqvist & Wiksell, Atlas,  (1998)
Almqvist & Wiksell, Atlas,  (1999)
For Turkish names:
Arkın Kitabevi, İlköğretim Atlası,  (1999)
F.S. Duran, Büyük Atlas,  (2000)
For Ukrainian names:
 Атлас Світу (1999)
For Welsh names:
Collins-Longman, Yr Atlas Cymraeg Newydd,  (1999)

names
Exonyms